Erigeron oxyphyllus is a species of flowering plant in the family Asteraceae known by the common name wand fleabane. It is native to northwestern Mexico (state of Sonora) and the southwestern United States (mostly Arizona but with a few populations in the Whipple Mountains just west of the Colorado River in California).

Erigeron oxyphyllus is a branching perennial herb up to 25 centimeters (10 inches) tall, producing a woody taproot. The leaves and the stem are covered with hairs. The plant generally produces 1-3 flower heads per stem, each head with 12–45 white, blue, or lavender ray florets surrounding numerous yellow disc florets.

References

Flora of Arizona
oxyphyllus
Plants described in 1895
Flora of Sonora
Flora of California
Flora without expected TNC conservation status